Peter Mark Richman (born Marvin Jack Richman; April 16, 1927 – January 14, 2021) was an American actor in films and on television, who was for many years credited as Mark Richman. He appeared in about 30 films and 130 television series from the 1950s until his retirement in 2011.

Career

Films 
Making his feature film debut in William Wyler's 1956 film Friendly Persuasion, Richman was, by that time, a regularly employed television actor, as well as a member of New York's Actors Studio, a resource of which he would avail himself frequently until moving to Los Angeles in 1961. He played Nicholas "Nick" Cain in the 1961 films The Murder Men and The Crimebusters. He reprised his role as Nicholas Cain in the television series Cain's Hundred. Richman's other TV roles were on the soap opera Santa Barbara as Channing Creighton 'C.C.' Capwell (1984), Longstreet as Duke Paige, on the soap opera Dynasty as Andrew Laird (1981–1984), and a recurring role on Three's Company (1978–1979) as Chrissy's father, Rev. Luther Snow. He guest-starred on Beverly Hills, 90210. His other films include Friday the 13th Part VIII: Jason Takes Manhattan (1989), and Vic (2005).

His last film credits were Mysteria and After the Wizard, both released in 2011. Richman sat on the board of trustees of the Motion Picture and Television Fund.

Television 
His television credits include Hawaii Five-O, Justice, The Fall Guy, The DuPont Show with June Allyson, Stoney Burke, Breaking Point, The Fugitive, The Outer Limits, Blue Light, The Invaders, Alfred Hitchcock Presents, The Man from U.N.C.L.E., The Wild Wild West, Bonanza, Daniel Boone, The Silent Force, Get Christie Love!, The Bionic Woman, Knight Rider, The Incredible Hulk, Three's Company, Mission: Impossible, Combat! and Matlock. He had multiple guest roles on The F.B.I. over its nine-year run. He appeared as Ralph Offenhouse in Star Trek: The Next Generations first season episode "The Neutral Zone". Richman starred in the penultimate filmed episode of The Twilight Zone, titled "The Fear". He voiced The Phantom in the animated series Defenders of the Earth. Personal life 
Born in Philadelphia, Pennsylvania to Jewish parents, Richman was the son of Yetta Dora (née Peck) and Benjamin Richman, a painting and paper-hanger contractor. He was married to actress Helen (Landess) Richman from 1953 until his death, and they had five children together, including composer and Grammy Award-winning conductor Lucas Richman. Before his acting career, he started off his career as a pharmacist. "My father died when I was 16 and my brother was kind of a surrogate father," recalled Richman. "He was a pharmacist and I worked in his store as a teenager. He thought I should get a real education so I ended up reluctantly going to pharmacy school. I expected to flunk out after six weeks but stuck it out, graduated, and became a licensed pharmacist in two states."

Richman died of natural causes in Woodland Hills, California, on January 14, 2021, at the age of 93.

Partial filmography

 Friendly Persuasion (1956) as Gard Jordan
 The Strange One (1957) as Cadet Colonel Corger
 Girls on the Loose (1958) as Police Lt. Bill Hanley 
 The Black Orchid (1958) as Noble
 Cain's Hundred (TV series, 1961-1962) as Nicholas Cain, series lead
 The Murder Men (1961) as Nick Cain
 The Crimebusters (1962) as Nicholas Cain
 The Outer Limits episode "The Borderland" (December 1963) as Professor Ian Fraser
 Combat!, 2 episodes, "The Hostages" (1964) as Capt. Aptmeyer & "Counterplay" (1966) as Marchand/German Lt.
 Dark Intruder (1965) as Robert Vandenburg
 Agent for H.A.R.M. (1966) as Adam Chance
 Blue Light (1966, TV series) (episode "The Friendly Enemy") as Von Stafenberg
 The Fugitive, 2 episodes (1964-1966, TV series) as Johnny / Deputy Steel
 Voyage to the Bottom of the Sea, season 2: "The Monster's Web" (1966, TV series) as Gantt
 The F.B.I. (1965-1974, TV series) in 8 different roles
 The Invaders, episode 4: "The Leeches" (January 31, 1967, TV series) as Tom Wiley
 Voyage to the Bottom of the Sea, season 4: "Secret of the Deep" (1968, TV series) as John Hendrix
 For Singles Only (1968) as Gerald Pryor
 Hawaii Five-O (1969, TV series) (episode "Along Came Joey") as Nick Morgan
 Lancer (1969, TV series) (episode “Angel Day and Her Sunshine Girls”) as Bolton
 House on Greenapple Road (1970) as Sal Gilman
 The Silent Force (1970, TV series) (episode "A Deadly Game of Love")
 Yuma (1971) as Major Lucas
 Hawkins (1974, TV series) (episode "Murder in the Slave Trade")
 Get Christie Love! (1974, TV series) as Young
 Electra Woman and Dyna Girl, 2 episodes (1976, TV series) as The Pharaoh
 The Bionic Woman (1977, TV series) (episode "Escape To Love") as Col. Dubnov
 Vega$ (1978, TV series) (episode "Lost Women")
 Wonder Woman (1978, TV series) (episode "Gault's Brain") as Dr. Crippin
 Three's Company, 3 episodes (1977-1979, TV series) as Reverend Snow
 Blind Ambition (1979, TV series) as Robert Mardian
 PSI Factor (1980) as Edgar Hamilton
 Battlestar Galactica 1980 (1980, TV series) episodes "The Night the Cylons Landed" Parts I and II as Colonel Briggs
 Dynasty, 27 episodes (1981-1984, TV series) as Andrew Laird
 Hart to Hart (1979-1984, TV series) (in "Murder of Jonathan Hart as Owen Grant and in "Harts at High Noon" as Arthur Horton
 Knight Rider (1983-1985, TV series) (in "Goliath Returns" as Dr. Klaus Bergstrom and in "Many Happy Returns" as Kleist)
 Star Trek: The Next Generation (1988, TV series) episode "The Neutral Zone", as Ralph Offenhouse
Murder She Wrote (1988)- Episode titled "Deadline for Murder" as Lamar Bennett
 Judgement Day (1988) as Priest
 Friday the 13th Part VIII: Jason Takes Manhattan (1989) as Charles McCulloch
 The Naked Gun 2½: The Smell of Fear (1991) as Arthur Dunwell
 Spider-Man: The Animated Series (1996, TV series) as voice of old Peter Parker / Spider-Man
 Superman: The Animated Series (1999) as voice of Abin Sur
 Poolhall Junkies (2002) as Phillip
 Vic (2005) as Paul Marcus
 After the Wizard (2011) as Charles Samuel Williams
 Mysteria'' (2011) as Senator Mitchell

References

External links

 
 
 
 
 Mark Richman at the University of Wisconsin's Actors Studio audio collection
 Peter Mark Richman Interview (Ft. Wayne News-Sentinel, 2014)
 2018 Fox News interview

1927 births
2021 deaths
20th-century American male actors
21st-century American male actors
American male film actors
American male soap opera actors
American male stage actors
American male television actors
American male voice actors
Jewish American male actors
Male actors from Los Angeles
Male actors from Philadelphia
21st-century American Jews
South Philadelphia High School alumni